Twin Brooks is a town in Grant County, South Dakota, United States. The population was 47 at the 2020 census.

Twin Brooks was named for two small streams near the town site; an early variant name was Two Creeks.

Geography

Twin Brooks is located at  (45.205510, -96.781717).

Twin Brooks has been assigned the ZIP code 57269 and the FIPS place code 64700.

Demographics

2010 census
As of the census of 2010, there were 69 people, 27 households, and 19 families residing in the town. The racial makeup of the town was 100.0% White.

There were 27 households, of which 25.9% had children under the age of 18 living with them, 59.3% were married couples living together, 11.1% had a female householder with no husband present, and 29.6% were non-families. 25.9% of all households were made up of individuals, and 11.1% had someone living alone who was 65 years of age or older. The average household size was 2.56 and the average family size was 3.05.

The median age in the town was 38.8 years. 24.6% of residents were under the age of 18; 7.2% were between the ages of 18 and 24; 23.1% were from 25 to 44; 33.3% were from 45 to 64; and 11.6% were 65 years of age or older. The gender makeup of the town was 58.0% male and 42.0% female.

2000 census
As of the census of 2000, there were 55 people, 24 households, and 18 families residing in the town. The population density was 139.3 people per square mile (54.5/km2). There were 28 housing units at an average density of 70.9 per square mile (27.7/km2). The racial makeup of the town was 100.00% White.

There were 24 households, out of which 37.5% had children under the age of 18 living with them, 62.5% were married couples living together, 4.2% had a female householder with no husband present, and 25.0% were non-families. 20.8% of all households were made up of individuals, and 12.5% had someone living alone who was 65 years of age or older. The average household size was 2.29 and the average family size was 2.61.

In the town, the population was spread out, with 23.6% under the age of 18, 3.6% from 18 to 24, 30.9% from 25 to 44, 23.6% from 45 to 64, and 18.2% who were 65 years of age or older. The median age was 43 years. For every 100 females, there were 83.3 males. For every 100 females age 18 and over, there were 100.0 males.

The median income for a household in the town was $24,250, and the median income for a family was $34,063. Males had a median income of $26,042 versus $18,750 for females. The per capita income for the town was $14,485. There were 10.5% of families and 13.3% of the population living below the poverty line, including 30.0% of under eighteens and 16.7% of those over 64.

References

Towns in Grant County, South Dakota
Towns in South Dakota